Homeobox protein Nkx-6.1 is a protein that in humans is encoded by the NKX6-1 gene.

Function 

In the pancreas, NKX6.1 is required for the development of beta cells and is a potent bifunctional transcription regulator that binds to AT-rich sequences within the promoter region of target genes.

References

Further reading